Dana Baiocco is a former member of the U.S. Consumer Product Safety Commission. President Donald Trump originally nominated her in 2017, and renominated her in the subsequent congressional session. The United States Senate confirmed her on May 22, 2018, and she was sworn in on June 1, 2018. She resigned on October 5, 2022.

Baiocco was previously an attorney at Jones Day in Boston, defending clients from liability claims, and is originally from Ohio. She graduated from Ohio University in 1998 and from Duquesne University School of Law in 1997, cum laude.

References

External links 
 CPSC biography

Living people
Ohio University alumni
U.S. Consumer Product Safety Commission
U.S. Consumer Product Safety Commission personnel
American women lawyers
American lawyers
Year of birth missing (living people)
Ohio Republicans
21st-century American women